Blue Mountain Resort is a ski resort located in Palmerton, Pennsylvania on Blue Mountain. 

Blue Mountain serves the Allentown, Philadelphia, New York City, and Wilmington urban areas and Carbon County, Schuylkill County, and the Hazleton areas. As of May 2021, KSL Resorts, which owns Camelback Resort, manages the resort.

History
The resort was opened by Ray Tuthill in 1977 as Little Gap Ski Area; he re-established it as Blue Mountain in 1989. With a new logo needed for the new name, Tuthill asked people from across the nation to submit ideas. The final selection of the characteristic skier in the word "mountain", was created by local designer, Carol Stickles. The resort celebrated its 30th anniversary during the 2007-08 season. In 2007, Barbara Green became the President and CEO of Blue Mountain, when she took over the resorts from her father and founder, Ray Tuthill. 

In 2002 and 2003, Blue Mountain added two advanced runs and a teaching hill with two beginner slopes, fed by a triple chairlift and a conveyor lift. In 2006, the resort added eastern Pennsylvania's first high-speed six-pack chairlift.

In summer 2008, the resort implemented a $3.1 million upgrade for the 2008-2009 ski season. It included improvements to the resort's snowmaking equipment, a newly built dining facility, and the addition of a new intermediate trail between Razor's Edge and Paradise named Dreamweaver.

In 2009, Blue Mountain became the first Pennsylvania ski resort and second resort in the country to have a BigAirBAG, which can be used to practice aerial maneuvers. As of the 2016-17 ski season, the bigairbag is no longer in use. 

In 2011, Blue Mountain began its annual Winter Fest. In 2018, Blue Mountain partnered with the United States Luge Association and created a natural luge for their Winter Fest. Blue Mountain Resort's Winter Fest was last held in January 2020. It has not resumed since. 

In 2019, Blue Mountain resort expanded its RFID access. Also for the 2019-2020 season, Blue Mountain opened their 40th trail, appropriately named, "Coming Soon." As of December 2021, snowmaking was added and the trail was renamed "FreeFall."

According to Ski Area Management, the construction of a new 6-pack chair will replace the Burma and Main St Chairs, begin in the spring of 2022 and be ready for the opening of 2022/2023 season.
"Blue Mountain’s new six pack will replace the Main Street and Burma doubles but start lower on the mountain than the existing lifts. The Leitner-Poma machine will rise 980 vertical feet in under five minutes. “The new lift aims to improve connectivity between Valley Lodge at the base and the Summit Lodge, as well as access to terrain on the western part of the mountain,” reported SAM. The lift will spin at 1,000 feet per minute with 80 carriers."

As of May 2022, Town Parke (a parking service) is hiring a Parking Concierge who will be responsible for accurately collecting and reconciling revenue at Blue Mountain Resort. As of May 2022, parking at Blue Mountain Resorts has historically been complimentary.

The Mountain
The summit is accessed by a high-speed quad, a six-person lift, or three double chairs. A beginner trail and an intermediate trail run down the outer, eastern side of the north-facing slope. Four expert runs follow the chairlifts to the bottom, and an access trail connects the summit to the western half of the resort.

Three double chairlifts rise up the western side of the resort, accessing mixed novice, intermediate, and expert terrain. The main resort lodge, located at the top of the mountain, is accessible by road. A dedicated beginner section adjacent to the lodge is served by a double chair and one surface lift. A beginner trail, Burma Road, connects to the beginner section at the bottom of the hill. A second lodge and the resort's snow tubing facility are also located at the bottom of the mountain near the Valley Lodge.

The resort has a total of 40 slopes. Blue Mountain has glade trails, beginner through expert, various terrain park installations, and training slopes. Blue Mountain uses RFID ticket scanners at every lift. It is the only ski resort in Pennsylvania to offer family-size tubes as well as single tubes, with both day and night snow tubing.

There are five terrain parks, which include Terrain Run, Lower Sidewinder, Come Around Park, and Central Park. Although it receives an average of only  of natural snowfall per year, natural snow is supplemented with 100% snowmaking coverage.

The resort hosts an alpine ski race team consisting of more than 125 USSA competitors and 75 developmental competitors. Its ski patrol is featured in the reality series Ski Patrol. which aired on truTV in the 2008-2009 season.

In addition to a substantial ski race team, the mountain also boasts a large staff of ski and snowboard instructors. Ski and Snowboard lessons are broken into four different categories: Family and Friends Beginner Lessons, Private Lessons, Explorers Children's Lessons, and 4 Week Children's Winter Adventure Camp.

Trails and Lifts

Trails

Lifts

Climate

According to the Köppen climate classification system, Blue Mountain Ski Resort has a warm summer humid continental climate (Dfb). Dfb climates are characterized by at least one month having an average mean temperature ≤ , at least four months with an average mean temperature ≥ , all months with an average mean temperature ≤  and no significant precipitation difference between seasons. Although most summer days are slightly humid at Blue Mountain Ski Resort, episodes of heat and high humidity can occur with heat index values > . Episodes of extreme cold and wind can occur with wind chill values < . Ice storms and large snowstorms depositing ≥  of snow occur once every couple of years.

Ecology

According to the A. W. Kuchler U.S. potential natural vegetation types, Blue Mountain Ski Resort would have a dominant vegetation type of Appalachian Oak (104) with a dominant vegetation form of Eastern Hardwood Forest (23). The spring bloom typically begins around April 22nd and fall color usually peaks before October 20th.

References

External links
Blue Mountain Ski Resort Official Site

1977 establishments in Pennsylvania
Ski areas and resorts in Pennsylvania
Pocono Mountains
Buildings and structures in Carbon County, Pennsylvania
Tourist attractions in Carbon County, Pennsylvania
Geography of Carbon County, Pennsylvania